= ColineOpéra =

French endowment fund

ColineOpéra is a French endowment fund that, with the collaboration of the world's greatest voices, produces operas and lyrical recitals for associations working in the field of health, protection and education of children at risk; La Chaîne de l'espoir, the MVE Foundation and the Association Toutes à l'École.
